Mattea Marie Conforti (born May 22, 2006) is an American actress. She made her debut as a replacement for the titular character in Matilda the Musical in 2015. In the same year, Conforti made her film debut playing a minor role in 3 Generations. On Broadway, she originated the role of Young Anna in Frozen and played Louise in the 2017 revival of Sunday in the Park with George. Conforti has starred in films and television shows such as Power, NOS4A2, The Super and Viper Club. Additionally, she voiced Young Elsa in Frozen II and the titular character of Moon in The Ollie & Moon Show.

Life and career

2006–2016: Early life and career beginnings
Conforti was born in 2006 in New Jersey to Nicole and Damian Conforti.  Conforti first appeared onscreen at age seven in a Charmin commercial. At a young age, Conforti bought tickets to see Matilda the Musical with her grandmother. Conforti felt a "tinge of disappointment" since she could "easily see herself [starring as the lead character]" and "[she] could have done that".

In September 2014, at the age of eight, Conforti attended an open casting call for Matilda the Musical. Two months later, Conforti received a callback and was cast as a replacement for the titular character. She learnt to speak with a British accent and performed from June 2015 to May 2016.

2017–present: Current work
In 2017, Conforti played the role of Louise in the 2017 revival of Sunday in the Park with George. Conforti voiced the titular character of Moon in The Ollie & Moon Show. Conforti originated the role of young Anna in Frozen, the stage adaptation of the 2013 film of the same name, first in a pre-Broadway tryout in Denver, then on Broadway in March 2018. Reception for the show was generally positive, and Conforti's performance was praised. For example, The Washington Post wrote that she and Ayla Schwartz, who portrayed young Elsa, were "exceptionally cast", while BBC News wrote that she was "super-perky" She left the cast during November 2018. 

Conforti played the titular character in The Muny's Matilda the Musical. She received mostly favourable reviews. Tanya Seale of BroadwayWorld called her "the delightful earworm" and Mark Bretz of Ladue News called her "dazzling". Conforti voiced young Elsa in Frozen II. She played Millie Manx in NOS4A2. The series was cancelled after its second season.

In 2021, Conforti portrayed the younger version of the character Janice Soprano in the film The Many Saints of Newark.

Stage

Filmography

Film

Television

References

External links

2006 births
21st-century American actresses
Actresses from New Jersey
American musical theatre actresses
American people of Italian descent
American film actresses
American television actresses
American stage actresses
American child actresses
People from West Caldwell, New Jersey
Living people